Jinyun Road is the current western terminus station on Line 13 of the Shanghai Metro. It is located in Jiading District, Shanghai.

Although service did not include mobile or Wi-Fi signals, the metro did provide stops to five stations in Jiading District.

References

Railway stations in Shanghai
Shanghai Metro stations in Jiading District
Railway stations in China opened in 2012
Line 13, Shanghai Metro